The Indian Pass Wilderness is  wilderness area under the administered by the Bureau of Land Management. The reserve is located in the very southeastern part of the Chocolate Mountains, in the southeastern part of California, just to the west of the Colorado River in the Lower Colorado River Valley. It adjoins the Picacho Peak Wilderness to the south, and the Imperial National Wildlife Refuge to the east.

Quartz Peak at 
lies in the west of the wilderness. Julian Wash, which drains eastwards into the Colorado River, marks the center of the wilderness and gives the name "Julian Wash Country" to the wilderness area.

Animals such as the Colorado River toad, desert bighorn sheep, and wild burros live in the refuge habitat.

See also
 California Desert Protection Act of 1994
 Chocolate Mountains
 Imperial National Wildlife Refuge

References

External links 
 
 
 

Protected areas of the Colorado Desert
Wilderness areas within the Lower Colorado River Valley
Protected areas of Imperial County, California
Bureau of Land Management areas in California